The Eritrean Catholic Eparchy of Segheneyti is a Catholic eparchy located in the town of Segheneyti in Eritrea. It is a part of the ecclesiastical province of Asmara. The eparchy follows the Alexandrian Rite, and has a cathedral of Saint Michael the Archangel.

History 
On 24 February 2012, Pope Benedict XVI established the Eparchy of Segheneyti from the Eparchy of Asmara and it became suffragan of the Ethiopian Catholic Archeparchy of Addis Abeba.

With the establishment of the autonomous sui iuris Eritrean Catholic Church by Pope Francis on 19 January 2015, the Eparchy of Segheneyti became a suffragan the Eritrean Catholic Archeparchy of Asmara.

Ordinaries 
 Fikremariam Hagos Tsalim (24 February 2012 – present)

References

External links 
 GCatholic 

Eritrean Catholic Church
Christian organizations established in 2012